Nepenthes glandulifera (from Latin glandula “gland" and ferre "to bear") is a species of pitcher plant endemic to the Hose Mountains of central Sarawak. This plant is so named for the black speckles around the petioles. The species's discoverer, Ch'ien Lee, initially thought they were a sign of disease. After further investigation, it was realised that the black speckles were actually nectar glands. The species is also notable for having a very prominent indumentum. It appears to be closely related to N. pilosa. Nepenthes glandulifera is not known to form natural hybrids with any other species.

Nepenthes glandulifera was included in a 2002 report on the Nepenthes of the Hose Mountains under the placeholder name Nepenthes sp. 'A'.

References

Further reading

 Kurup, R., A.J. Johnson, S. Sankar, A.A. Hussain, C.S. Kumar & S. Baby 2013. Fluorescent prey traps in carnivorous plants. Plant Biology 15(3): 611–615. 
 Lee, C.C. 2002. Nepenthes species of the Hose Mountains in Sarawak, Borneo. [video] The 4th International Carnivorous Plant Conference, Tokyo, Japan. (video by Irmgard & Siegfried R. H. Hartmeyer)
 McPherson, S.R. & A. Robinson 2012. Field Guide to the Pitcher Plants of Borneo. Redfern Natural History Productions, Poole.
 Renner, T. & C.D. Specht 2011. A sticky situation: assessing adaptations for plant carnivory in the Caryophyllales by means of stochastic character mapping. International Journal of Plant Sciences 172(7): 889–901. 

Carnivorous plants of Asia
glandulifera
Plants described in 2004